Chief of Army (CA) is the effective commander of the New Zealand Army, responsible to the Chief of Defence Force (CDF) for raising, training and sustaining those forces necessary to meet agreed government outputs. The CA acts as principal advisor to the CDF on Army matters, though for operations the Army's combat units fall under the command of the Land Component Commander, Joint Forces New Zealand. The rank associated with the position is major general, and CAs are generally appointed on a three-year term.

The position was originally formed as Commandant and General Officer Commanding the New Zealand Military Forces in 1910, changing to Chief of the General Staff in 1937 and, finally, CA in 2002. Major General John Boswell, the incumbent CA, has held the post since 1 September 2018.

Appointees
 This along with the * (asterisk) indicates that the individual was subsequently promoted to lieutenant general and appointed Chief of Defence Force.

The following list chronologically records those who have held the post of Chief of Army or its preceding positions, with rank and honours as at the completion of the individual's term.

References

New Zealand
New Zealand Army